The lesser necklaced laughingthrush (Garrulax monileger) is a species of bird in the family Leiothrichidae.

Distribution
It is found in Bangladesh, Bhutan, Cambodia, China, India, Laos, Myanmar, Nepal, Thailand, and Vietnam. Its natural habitats are subtropical or tropical moist lowland forest and subtropical or tropical moist montane forest.

References

lesser necklaced laughingthrush
Birds of Eastern Himalaya
Birds of South China
Birds of Southeast Asia
lesser necklaced laughingthrush
Taxonomy articles created by Polbot